The Basmane-Nazilli Regional, numbered as B310, is a  passenger train operated by the Turkish State Railways, that runs between Basmane Terminal in Izmir to Nazilli. The train operates along the same route as the Basmane-Denizli Regional, serving a shorter portion of the line. Before regional service was extended to Denizli after track upgrades, three daily trains in each direction would operate as the Basmane-Nazilli Regional. Train service started in 2009 after the completion of the Şirinyer Tunnel.

Railway services introduced in 2009
2009 establishments in Turkey
Transport in İzmir Province
Transport in Aydın Province
Regional rail in Turkey